Jay Ryan (born June 15, 1972, in St. Louis, Missouri) is a poster maker and rock musician. He is noted for his squirrel posters as well as being a bassist in the band Dianogah.

Working in Skokie, Illinois, Ryan produces limited run, hand-printed posters for rock bands and concerts, and for events such as art shows. Most of his work is screen printed at his print shop, The Bird Machine.  He has produced posters for the bands Shellac and the Flaming Lips, as well as thousands of others; he is also responsible for the album art and track illustrations of Andrew Bird's The Mysterious Production of Eggs and Weather Systems

In 2005 he published a book called 100 Posters, 134 Squirrels: A Decade of Hot Dogs, Large Mammals, and Independent Rock: The Handcrafted Art of Jay Ryan. He also provided the cover art for Michael Chabon's 2004 novel The Final Solution and publicity art for Chicago's 57th Street Art Fair.

Ryan had previously been a bassist for Braid, but left shortly after its formation.  He then joined Hubcap before forming Dianogah in 1995.

Jay Ryan attended New Trier High School in Winnetka, IL.

Sources
 Anders Smith Lindall, "Off the Wall: Jay Ryan's Whimsical Illustrations Put a Face on the Chicago Rock Scene", Chicago Sun-Times, Tuesday, December 20, 2005, p. 49
 Jay Ryan, 100 Posters, 134 Squirrels: A Decade of Hot Dogs, Large Mammals, and Independent Rock: The Handcrafted Art of Jay Ryan, Akashic Books, Chicago, Illinois 2005

External links
Galleries at The Bird Machine
Exhibition at the richard goodall gallery
Review of 100 Posters, 134 Squirrels at PopMatters.com
Galleries and Sale at the ICO O'Hare Hotel
documentary film featuring Jay Ryan

American rock bass guitarists
American poster artists
Album-cover and concert-poster artists
Living people
1972 births
Guitarists from Chicago
American male bass guitarists
21st-century American bass guitarists
21st-century American male musicians